The Rankin Building is a historic building in Downtown Columbus, Ohio. The building was completed in 1899 by L.L. Rankin. It was built for the Buckeye State Building and Loan Co., which Rankin was president of. The company later moved down the street to the Buckeye Building. A Neoclassical facade was added in 1930 when it became the Union Building Savings and Loan Company building. It was listed on the National Register of Historic Places in 1982. The building's current tenant is the Diamond Exchange, a local jeweler owned by a former chair and current member of the city's Historic Resources Commission.

See also
 National Register of Historic Places listings in Columbus, Ohio

References

External links
 
 Columbus Diamond Exchange

National Register of Historic Places in Columbus, Ohio
1899 establishments in Ohio
Buildings and structures completed in 1899
Buildings in downtown Columbus, Ohio
Neoclassical architecture in Ohio
Bank buildings in Columbus, Ohio